The 2014 Seguros Bolívar Open Pereira was a professional tennis tournament played on clay courts. It was the sixth edition of the tournament which was part of the 2014 ATP Challenger Tour. It took place in Pereira, Colombia between 22 and 28 September 2014.

Singles main-draw entrants

Seeds

 1 Rankings are as of September 15, 2014.

Other entrants
The following players received wildcards into the singles main draw:
  Alejandro Falla
  Daniel Elahi Galán
  Juan Carlos Spir
  Eduardo Struvay

The following players received entry from the qualifying draw:
  Iván Endara
  José Hernández
  Wilson Leite
  Juan Pablo Varillas

The following player received entry by a special exempt:
  Gonzalo Escobar

Champions

Singles

 Víctor Estrella Burgos def.  João Souza, 7–6(7–5), 3–6, 7–6(8–6)

Doubles

 Nicolás Barrientos /  Eduardo Struvay def.  Guido Pella /  Horacio Zeballos, 3–6, 6–3, [11–9]

External links
Official Website

Seguros Bolivar Open Pereira
Seguros Bolívar Open Pereira
2014 in Colombian tennis